Justin Timberlake + The Tennessee Kids is a 2016 American concert film directed by Jonathan Demme, documenting the final performances of Justin Timberlake's The 20/20 Experience World Tour at the MGM Grand Garden Arena in Las Vegas. Released on Netflix on October 12, 2016, it was the final film directed by Demme before his death in April of the following year.

Cast

Production
Demme initially contacted Timberlake after seeing his performance in The Social Network (2010); in the meeting they discussed Talking Heads concert film Stop Making Sense (1984), directed by Demme and an influence for the singer in his live performances.

The performance captured in Justin Timberlake + The Tennessee Kids was filmed over two nights, January 1–2, 2015. Demme used 14 operated cameras that Declan Quinn, the director of photography, and he deployed over many pre-filming engagements, including two other free-floating cameras in the audience and one cameraman onstage with Timberlake.

Timberlake dedicated the film to Prince, who died during post-production. "His influence is all over everyone's music and there's so much that I feel like I've maybe consciously and unconsciously borrowed from him that it felt right", he told E! "It just feels right to dedicate the film to him."

Setlist
"Pusher Love Girl"
"Gimme What I Don't Know (I Want)"/"Rock Your Body"
"Don't Hold the Wall"/"FutureSex/LoveSound"
"Like I Love You"
"My Love"
"LoveStoned"
"Until the End of Time"
"Holy Grail"
"Only When I Walk Away"
"Drink You Away"
"Let the Groove Get In"
"Human Nature"
"What Goes Around... Comes Around"
"Poison"
"Suit & Tie"
"SexyBack"
"Mirrors"

Reception
Netflix announced its acquisition of the film shortly before its September 13, 2015 premiere at the Toronto International Film Festival. The film premiered worldwide on Netflix October 12, 2016.

Reviewing the concert film, critic David Rooney from Billboard wrote:

It's noteworthy that after two years and 134 dates on the 20/20 Experience World Tour, the act is drilled to perfection but never robotic. All six dancers combine precision with a personal signature, as do the musicians and singers who frequently step out from behind their 1940s big band-style JT music stands to cut loose. Timberlake is a magnetic performer who moves with twitchy sensuality in his Tom Ford tux. But I could just as easily have watched bespectacled vocalist Jack E. King III get his groove on all night, since there's nothing quite so ecstatically graceful as a heavy-set dude with funk in his bones.

Nigel M. Smith from The Guardian noted "his falsetto is on-point throughout, as are his smooth moves – like a blend of Frank Sinatra, Michael Jackson and Prince, to whom the film is dedicated. There's a sexy swagger to Timberlake's onstage personae that never reads as cocksure, largely because of the lavish attention he pays to his band and dancers...  They all look like there's no place they’d rather be, despite it being the end of a grueling two year tour. In an era when machines are largely responsible for the beats that drive pop music, the reverence Timberlake shows for actual instruments is worth endearing. Still, there's no mistaking Timberlake as ring leader." Brian Tallerico of the Roger Ebert website gave the film three-and-a-half out of four stars, and wrote "Demme opens his fantastically entertaining concert film by introducing us to the backup players and musicians who have supported the pop star on this two-year tour, but make no mistake, this movie is about the entertainer at its center. While Demme's camera never forgets to allow the other partners in pop to share time, he always comes back to Timberlake, one of the most purely enjoyable musicians around which one could center a concert film. His energy is infectious and his joy about what he's been blessed to do for a living is contagious".

On review aggregator website Rotten Tomatoes, the film has an approval rating of 86%, based on 14 reviews, with an average rating of 8.1/10. On Metacritic, the film has a score 81 out of 100, based on 6 reviews, indicating "universal acclaim".

References

External links

2016 films
2016 documentary films
American documentary films
Justin Timberlake
Concert films
Documentary films about singers
Films directed by Jonathan Demme
Films shot in the Las Vegas Valley
Netflix specials
2010s English-language films
2010s American films